Hedwiga Reicher (Born Hedwig Reicher; 12 June 1884 – 2 September 1971) was a German actress. Her performances on Broadway were credited with the original spelling of her first name.

Reicher was christened Hedwig, but she altered the spelling after she came to the United States because some people called her "Mr. Hedwig". She was half-sister of actor Frank Reicher, sister of actor and screenwriter Ernst Reicher, and daughter of actor Emanuel Reicher. Another brother, Hans Reicher, was a sculptor, and her sister, Elly, was an actress.

Reicher's film debut came in The Rubaiyat of Omar Khayyam, produced by Ferdinand Earle.

In addition to acting, Reicher produced two plays with her father and in 1921 had a solo production of Monna Vanna at Los Angeles's Little Theater. She also acted in all three.

On February 2, 1934, Reicher married concert pianist and music teacher Maurice Zam in Hollywood, California.

Selected filmography
 A Lover's Oath (1925) – Hassan's wife
 The King of Kings (1927) – (uncredited)
 The Leopard Lady (1928) – Fran Holweg
 True Heaven (1929) – Madame Grenot
 The Godless Girl (1929) – Prison Matron
 Lucky Star (1929) – Mrs. Tucker
 Mordprozeß Mary Dugan (1931) – Mrs. Rice
 Beyond Victory (1931) – German Nurse (uncredited)
 Sporting Chance (1931) – Aunt Hetty
 The Dragon Murder Case (1934) – Mrs. Schwartz (uncredited)
 Rendezvous (1935) – De Segroff's Associate (uncredited)
 The House of a Thousand Candles (1936) – Maria
 I Married a Doctor (1936) – Bessie Valborg
 Dracula's Daughter (1936) – the innkeeper's wife (uncredited)
 It Could Happen to You (1937) – German Woman at Boardinghouse (uncredited)
 Confessions of a Nazi Spy (1939) – Lisa Kassel
 Dr. Ehrlich's Magic Bullet (1940) – Nurse (uncredited, Last appearance)

Broadway roles
 On the Eve (1909), her Broadway debut
 The Next of Kin (1909)
 Henrik Ibsen's The Lady from the Sea (1911) – Ellida
 The Thunderbolt (1911)
 June Madness (1912) – Mrs. Thornborough
 The Stronger (1913)
 When the Young Vine Blooms (1915)
 Caliban of the Yellow Sands (1916) – Cleopatra
--Source: Internet Broadway Database

Other
Reicher was hired to portray the mythological figure Columbia for the Woman Suffrage Procession, a suffrage parade on March 3, 1913, in Washington, DC. According to news reports at the time, the group, which included 5000 to 8000 suffragists, marched from the US Capitol to the Treasury Building, and was watched by a crowd of 500,000 (mostly men).  Their intent was to upstage Woodrow Wilson's inauguration, due to take place the following day.

References

External links

Portrait, NY Public Library, Billy Rose collection
Portraits of Hedwig Reicher and her father Emanuel Reicher (gutenberg.org)

German film actresses
1884 births
1971 deaths
German emigrants to the United States
American stage actresses
German stage actresses
American film actresses
American silent film actresses
German silent film actresses
People from Oldenburg (city)
20th-century German actresses
20th-century American actresses